The Chapel of Saint George Pachymachiotis is a chapel and a church in the Greek town of Lindos, in Rhodes, dedicated to Saint George.

 

The church was built in the late 14th century and it lies in the historical center of the ancient town of Lindos.

References

14th-century churches in Greece
Buildings and structures in Rhodes